New Creation Church, or abbreviated as NCC, is a Christian megachurch in Singapore founded in 1984. It holds services at The Star Performing Arts Centre. It is a non-denominational Christian church, and a member of the National Council of Churches of Singapore. It is not affiliated to any church overseas. The senior pastor of the church is Joseph Prince.

The church was one of three megachurches to make it to a list of Singapore's 10 largest charities, according to a report by The Straits Times in 2019.

History

The church was founded by a small group including Joseph Prince, Henry Yeo, David Yeow and Jack Ho in 1983. It was later officially registered with the Registrar of Societies in October 1984. It began its Sunday service with an average attendance of 25 people. Gradually, it grew to about 150 members in 1990 when Prince was appointed as the senior pastor of the church.

During the period between 1984 and 1999, the church used different worship venues such as a hall within the premises of the Young Women's Christian Association of Singapore and the ballrooms in local hotels to accommodate its growing congregation.

In 1999, the church moved to the Rock Auditorium in Suntec City Mall. On 23 December 2012, its services were shifted to The Star PAC.

Outreach

The church is involved in outreach work and missions throughout the Asian region, and sends its pastors, leaders and volunteers to several Asian countries annually.

Ten per cent of the church's annual budget which was about US$4 million (as of Year 2007) was set aside for missionary work. Currently, the church is still committed to helping missionaries. In addition, the church also makes donations to local charities annually. Specifically, the church has given SGD581,500 to community groups and charities during the period between April 2007 and March 2008.

Business arm
The New Creation Church Group consists of the church as well as its for-profit business entities which it says have generated a net surplus every year.

The Star Vista 
The Star Vista is a shopping mall occupying the bottom six floors of The Star, a 15-storey mixed use complex that the church co-developed with CapitaLand and was opened in September 2012. In November 2019, the church paid S$296 million to acquire the mall after it heard that CapitaLand was in talks with buyers for a potential sale. The church said that the acquisition was made "to protect the interest of the church" because another buyer could have been less supportive of the church's use of the property for religious purposes.

Omega Tours & Travel Pte Ltd 
Omega Tours & Travel Pte Ltd is a travel agency that specialises in package and private tours to Holy Land destinations in Israel, Jordan, Turkey and Greece. Pastor Joseph Prince has been known to be featured in high-profile Holy Land tours speaking alongside other prominent pastors such as Joel Osteen.

Worship venue
The church moved to a new 5,000 (5,142) seat theatre, now its main worship venue, at The Star PAC in Buona Vista on 23 December 2012.

Officially opened on 1 November 2012, The Star PAC spans levels 3 to 11, known as the civic and cultural zone, of the building called The Star. It is owned and managed by Rock Productions, the business arm of the church. The Star PAC comprises a 5,000-seat theatre, a multi-purpose hall, an outdoor amphitheatre, special function rooms and other facilities. The church rents The Star PAC for Sunday services.

The levels from Basement 4 to Level 2 of The Star, known as the retail and entertainment zone (including the car park lots), is called The Star Vista, and is owned by the church.

The Star, comprising The Star Vista and The Star PAC, was envisioned as a "futuristic complex with restaurants, shops and a 5,000-seat theatre", and costs an estimated SGD1 billion.

Controversies

Adam Lambert's performance at The Star Performing Arts Centre
In May 2013, the National Council of Churches of Singapore (NCCS) said it was looking into a complaint about Adam Lambert performing at The Star Performing Arts Centre, a commercial entity fully owned by Rock Productions, the business arm of New Creation Church. Lim K. Tham, general secretary of the council said it had received a complaint that "the gay lifestyle may be promoted at the concert" and that "The NCCS has conveyed this concern to New Creation so that it can make a response."

In a statement, the church said that according to stipulations from the authorities before the tender was awarded to Rock Productions, the venue had to operate "on a purely commercial basis and will not implement any leasing or pricing policies that will discriminate between religious groups, institutions or organisations from hiring the venue". The church said all public events require a public entertainment licence from the police, and it had "utmost confidence" in the policies and ability of government bodies such as the Media Development Authority to "protect the interest of the general public". The statement added that any event at the performing arts centre "should not be misconstrued or misunderstood" as the church "approving of its artistic presentation or endorsing the lifestyle of the performer".

See also

 Christianity in Singapore
 Evangelism
 Nondenominational Christianity

References

External links
 
 Rock Productions
 The Star Performing Arts Centre

Christian organizations established in 1984
Evangelical megachurches in Singapore
Religious organisations based in Singapore
1984 establishments in Singapore